The Bridge End Inn is a pub in Ruabon, Wales.

History 
The Bridge End Inn was formally known as the Bricklayers Arms between the 1850s and 1880s. In March 2009, the Bridge End Inn was opened after being closed for six months.  It incorporates the McGivern microbrewery.

Awards 
2011
CAMRA's National Pub of the Year for 2011.
Welsh Regional Pub of the Year
Chester & South Clwyd CAMRA Welsh Pub of the Year

2012
National CAMRA Pub of the Year Runners-Up
Welsh Regional Pub of the Year
Chester & South Clwyd CAMRA Welsh Pub of the Year

2014
Chester & South Clwyd CAMRA Welsh Pub of the Year

2015
Chester & South Clwyd CAMRA Welsh Pub of the Year

2017
Chester & South Clwyd CAMRA Welsh Pub of the Year

2018
Chester & South Clwyd CAMRA Welsh Pub of the Year

References

External links

Pubs in Wales